Hammerwich is a civil parish in the district of Lichfield, Staffordshire, England.  The parish contains eight listed buildings that are recorded in the National Heritage List for England.  All the listed buildings are designated at Grade II, the lowest of the three grades, which is applied to "buildings of national importance and special interest".  The parish contains the village of Hammerwich and smaller settlements, and the surrounding area.  The listed buildings include houses and farmhouses, a windmill converted into a house, a church, and a milepost.


Buildings

References

Citations

Sources

Lichfield District
Lists of listed buildings in Staffordshire